Euphaedra katangensis is a butterfly in the family Nymphalidae. It is found in the Democratic Republic of the Congo and Zambia.

References

Butterflies described in 1927
katangensis